Cornafean is a Gaelic Athletic Association club based in the rural parishes of Killeshandra and Kilmore, in County Cavan, Ireland. The club plays Gaelic Football and competes in Cavan GAA competitions. Cornafean is the most successful club in Cavan, having won 20 Cavan Senior Football Championships. The club produced some of the best players in the 'Golden Era' of the Cavan team. The club's last championship title at adult level was in 2016 when they won the 2016 Cavan Junior Championship title. however, in recent years they have fallen under the shadow of near neighbours Ballinagh.

Honours

Cavan Senior Football Championships: 20
1909, 1910, 1912, 1913, 1914, 1915, 1918, 1920, 1928, 1929, 1932, 1933, 1934, 1936, 1937, 1938, 1939, 1940, 1943, 1956.
Cavan Intermediate Football Championships Winners: 2
1915, 1916
Cavan Junior Football Championships Winners: 4
1914, 1927, 2000, 2016

Notable players
John Joe O'Reilly - Captain of two All-Ireland winning Cavan teams.
Tom O'Reilly - Former Cavan midfielder

References

External links
Cornafean GFC Official Website
Official Cavan GAA Website
Cavan Club GAA

1908 establishments in Ireland
Gaelic games clubs in County Cavan
Gaelic football clubs in County Cavan